Beaumont Park Stadium or the Paul Chapman and Sons Arena for sponsorship purposes is a sports stadium on Beaumont Park, Leicester. The stadium is mainly used for motorcycle speedway and is the home track for the Leicester Lions.

At the meeting of the Leicester City Council Planning and Development Control Committee held on 4 August 2009 the application for a speedway track at Beaumont Park was approved. The track was constructed during 2010 and opened in 2011.

See also
Leicester Lions
Leicester Stadium (speedway team)

References

Speedway venues in England
Sports venues in Leicester
Sports venues in Leicestershire